Hans Christensen (7 June 1906 – 17 May 1992) was a Danish footballer. He played in one match for the Denmark national football team in 1934.

References

External links
 

1906 births
1992 deaths
Danish men's footballers
Denmark international footballers
Sportspeople from Frederiksberg
Association football forwards
Kjøbenhavns Boldklub players